Bathypolypus arcticus, the North Atlantic octopus, deep sea octopus or spoonarm octopus is a small species of demersal octopus of the North Atlantic.

Description

Like other deep-sea octopuses, Bathypolypus arcticus do not have ink sacs.

The mantle is globular, being nearly as wide as it is long. The surface of mantle, head, arms and web is covered in warts, especially around the eyes. The arms are short and in an irregular order with two rows of small suckers.

Ecology

Bathypolypus arcticus has low fecundity meaning that they lay fewer, relatively larger eggs than many other octopuses from which benthic young hatch. The female broods her eggs for over 400 days during which time it ceases to eat and slowly wastes away as it metabolises its own body to provide energy to guard the eggs and young. This was considered the longest brooding period for an octopus until surpassed by Graneledone boreopacifica.

Unusually for octopuses, Bathypolypus arcticus mainly feeds on brittle stars, but this may depend on availability, as captives prefer crustaceans. A wide range of other food items have been recorded in smaller quantities, including polychaetes, sipunculid worms, foraminiferas and bivalves. In captivity, adults have been housed together without showing the aggressive, cannibalistic tendencies known from several other octopuses.

Bathypolypus arcticus have longer life spans than other octopuses where it is known and may live for six years or more. In comparison, many shallow water octopuses only live for a year. Higher water temperatures result in increased growth rates, but shorter life spans in Bathypolypus arcticus. Temperatures above  are typically lethal to this cold-water species, although specimens have survived at  if slowly acclimated.

Bathypolypus arcticus is the host for the dicyemid parasite Dicyemennea canadensis, which lives in the renal appendage of the infected octopus.

Distribution

The North Atlantic from the Florida Straits, north along the eastern seaboard to Greenland, Iceland, Spitsbergen then south along the European coast into the North Sea, including Great Britain and Ireland.

References

Octopodidae
Cephalopods described in 1847
Cephalopods of Europe